Ranjith Premasiri Madalana alias "Nero" was a decorated Sri Lanka Army sniper with 217 confirmed LTTE kills during the Eelam War.

He was killed on 28 April 2009, 20 days before the end of the conflict.

Military career
At the height of the Sri Lankan Civil War, Premasiri joined the Sri Lanka Army Volunteer Force in 1991 at the age of 22. After his training at the Diyathalawa Army base, he was attached to the 5th Battalion of the Gajaba Regiment.

After completing the Sri Lanka Army 8th sniper course, he joined the Army snipers in 2000.

He was injured several times during his service but insisted on serving in active duty.

On 28 April 2009, LTTE combatants took hiding among Tamil refugees that were fleeing to government controlled areas in Puthumathalan. While tracking the combatants, Corporal Premasiri was killed by an LTTE sniper.

The Sri Lankan Civil war ended on 18 May 2009 just 20 days after Corporal Premasiri's death. At the time of his death, he had served 18 years in the Sri Lanka Army and 9 years of it as a sniper with 217 confirmed kills.

Legacy
In 2021, Arimac Lanka Private Limited launched a third person stealth action game called "Nero" focused on him and his family. Throughout the game, the game designers pay a tribute to the Sri Lankan forces, especially Nero. The game which is available on Steam has a PC-based single-player campaign and a mobile-based multiplayer.

See also
 List of snipers
 List of Sri Lankan military personnel

References

1969 births
2009 deaths
Military personnel killed in action
Sri Lankan military personnel killed in action
Sinhalese military personnel
Gajaba Regiment soldiers